The Payson ophiolite is an ophiolite of Statherian age (late Paleoproterozoic) located near Payson, Arizona, US.

Description
The Payson ophiolite crops out south and west of the town of Payson, Arizona, in the Arizona transition zone between the Colorado Plateau and the Basin and Range. It consists of a well-developed sheeted dyke complex that grades below into gabbroic rock and above into submarine volcanic rock. The whole sequence dips gently (by about 15 degrees) to the southwest. The ophiolite is exposed over a sizable area and is little deformed, with metamorphism limited to the lower greenschist facies. Much of the gabbro is essentially unaltered.

The ophiolite is intruded by a sill of granitic rock, the Payson Granite, which conceals the deepest layers of the ophiolite, including the entire ultramafic mantle portion of the ophiolite. The deepest accessible layers are the gabbronorite of Round Valley. Regionally, the ophiolite is thought to be overlain by the Tonto Basin Supergroup.

Origin and Tectonics
The Payson ophiolite lies on a basement of granitic rock overlain by felsic volcanic and volcaniclastic rock of the Larson Spring Formation. This shows that the ophiolite was emplaced by rifting of an existing island arc, which likely produced a pull-apart basin.

References

Ophiolites
Precambrian Arizona